Armorial of the Communes of Nord due to its length, it is split into 4 sub pages :
 Armorial of the Communes of Nord (A–C)
 Armorial of the Communes of Nord (D–H)
 Armorial of the Communes of Nord (I–P)
 Armorial of the Communes of Nord (Q–Z)

Together, these pages lists the armoury (emblazons=graphics and blazons=heraldic descriptions; or coats of arms) of the communes in Nord (department 59)

Nord (French department)
All stub articles
Nord